= Bharat Bichitra =

- Cover of November 2018
- Editor: Arabinda Chackraborti
- Categories: Literature, Art, Culture, History, Travel, Poem
- Frequency: Monthly
- Publisher: Indian High Commission, Dhaka
- First issue: April 1973
- Country: Bangladesh
- Based in: Dhaka
- Language: Bengali
- Website: hcidhaka.gov.in/bharat

Bharat Bichitra, a monthly magazine in the Bengali language, is published by the Indian High Commission in Dhaka, Bangladesh. It was first published in 1973.

== History ==
Bharat Bichitra, launched in April 1973, is a Bengali-language monthly magazine established with the aim of fostering literary and cultural exchange. Over the years, renowned poets and writers from both Bangladesh and India have contributed to the publication. Since early 2015, Bharat Bichitra has expanded its reach by being available online.

The magazine was under the editorial guidance of poet Belal Chowdhury for an extended period. In 1998, Nantu Roy became the editor. Currently, the editorial responsibilities are held by Arvind Chakraborty.

== Description ==
Every edition of Bharat Bichitra encompasses a diverse array of content, featuring articles, interviews, travelogues, and anthologies that delve into various facets of Indian culture, history, politics, economics, poetry, and current affairs. Notably, each issue spotlights a special theme; for instance, the April 2023 edition focused on the celebration of Bangla New Year.

Comprising contributions from both Indian and Bangladeshi authors, Bharat Bichitra serves as a collaborative platform, fostering cultural exchange and mutual understanding. The magazine is dedicated to promoting unity and cooperation between the rich traditions of India and Bangladesh, aiming to bridge cultural gaps and strengthen the bonds between the two nations.
